Barrie Jones (7 August 1929 – 4 April 2011) was a New Zealand cricketer. He played in one first-class match for Central Districts in 1954/55.

See also
 List of Central Districts representative cricketers

References

External links
 

1929 births
2011 deaths
New Zealand cricketers
Central Districts cricketers
Cricketers from Whanganui